A list of animated television series first aired in 2007.

See also
 List of animated feature films of 2007
 List of Japanese animation television series of 2007

References

Television series
Animated series
2007
2007
2007-related lists